Joe M. Seng (September 27, 1946 – September 16, 2016) was the Iowa State Senator from the 45th District. A Democrat, he served in the Iowa Senate from 2003 until 2016. He received a DVM from Iowa State University and worked as a veterinarian in Davenport, running a veterinary clinic for low income families.

, Seng served on several committees in the Iowa Senate - the Commerce, Ethics, and Natural Resources and Environment committees. He also served as chair of the Agriculture Committee and as vice chair of the Ways and Means Committee, as well as serving as a member of the Economic Development Appropriations Subcommittee. Before serving in the Senate, Seng served as the 43rd District representative in the Iowa House of Representatives from 2000 to 2002 and served as an alderman in Davenport. Seng died in office on September 16, 2016, from brain cancer.

Electoral history

*Incumbent

References

External links

Senator Joe Seng official Iowa Legislature site
Senator Joe Seng official Iowa General Assembly site
State Senator Joe Seng official constituency site
 

1946 births
2016 deaths
Democratic Party Iowa state senators
Iowa State University alumni
American veterinarians
Male veterinarians
Democratic Party members of the Iowa House of Representatives
People from Lost Nation, Iowa
Politicians from Davenport, Iowa
Iowa city council members
Deaths from brain cancer in the United States
Deaths from cancer in Iowa